Nathan Moss (March 2, 1819 – May 6, 1887) was a merchant and political figure in Nova Scotia. He represented Yarmouth township in the Nova Scotia House of Assembly from 1855 to 1859.

He was born in Yarmouth, Nova Scotia, the son of William Frances Moses and Lydia Butler. Moses married Sarah Ryerson. Moses was a justice of the peace from 1863 to 1887. He also served as custos rotulorum for Yarmouth from 1873 to 1875. With his partner John K. Ryerson, he was involved in the trade with the West Indies. Moses was also president of the Yarmouth Marine Railway Company, a member of the board of governors for the Yarmouth Seminary and a director of the Yarmouth Gas Light Company, the Yarmouth Steam Navigation Company and the Yarmouth Building Society. He died in Halifax at the age of 68.

References 
 A Directory of the Members of the Legislative Assembly of Nova Scotia, 1758-1958, Public Archives of Nova Scotia (1958)

1819 births
1887 deaths
People from Yarmouth, Nova Scotia
Nova Scotia pre-Confederation MLAs